Dimitrios Kokotsis (28 March 1894 – 1961) was a Greek painter. His work was part of the painting event in the art competition at the 1948 Summer Olympics.

References

1894 births
1961 deaths
20th-century Greek painters
Greek male painters
Olympic competitors in art competitions
People from Kissamos